is a 1991 fighting game published for the Mega Drive in Japan and North America. The game's cover art was created by Yasushi Nirasawa, in his position as a model-builder for Hobby Japan magazine.

Gameplay 

Beast Wrestler is a wrestling beat 'em up video game containing two modes: Match and Tournament. Match is a single-round that can be played with two human players or one player and a computer opponent, whereas Tournament has multiple rounds and requires the player to showdown with every beast in the game.

Reception 

The presentation, although generally the most-well received aspect of Beast Wrestler, garnered a mixed response. Joystick called it the best part.

Paul Rand of Computer and Video Games found the premise of monsters in a wrestling game interesting, but strongly dismissed its gameplay as "dull, simplistic and annoying in equal parts", heavily attributed to unresponsive controls. He also criticized the unsuitable music and visuals. Although appreciating the monsters' design, he was critical of the sprites' animation, shadows, their identical sizes, and flickering. Mega also found it a "tedious" experience with very few attacks to experiment with. He disliked the graphics, such as the "boring empty ring-type arena thingy" and choppy animation.

Entertainment Weeklys Bob Strauss also called the gameplay tedious, despite its "thumb-busting array of holds and throws". He praised the presentation, such as the "electrified, three-dimensional playing field" and "appropriately gruesome creatures (which look like something out of a David Cronenberg movie)", although also joked, "When the monsters tangle it up in the ring, you're reminded of those intricate mating rituals Marlin Perkins used to narrate on Wild Kingdom."

References

1991 video games
Fighting games
Science fiction video games
Sega Genesis games
Sega Genesis-only games
Video games developed in Japan
Video games set in 2020
Multiplayer and single-player video games